Frank-Jürgen Weise (born 8 October 1951 in Radebeul, East Germany) is a German officer (Oberst of the reserve) and manager.

Career
From 2004 until 2017, Weise served as CEO of the Bundesagentur für Arbeit, the German Federal Agency for Employment. In addition, in 2010, he chaired the ad-hoc Bundeswehr Structural Commission.

From 2015, Weise also headed of the Federal Office for Migration and Refugees. In 2014, he became CEO of the Hertie Foundation.

Other activities

Corporate boards
 Rantum Capital, Partner

Non-profit organizations
 IZA Institute of Labor Economics, Member of the Scientific Council (since 2017)
 Deutsche Post Stiftung, Member of the Scientific Council
 Goethe University Frankfurt, Member of the Board of Trustees
 Hertie School of Governance, Member of the Supervisory Board
 Jugend debattiert, Chairman of the Board of Trustees
 Federal Academy for Security Policy (BAKS), Member of the Advisory Board (since 2012)
 Deutsche Nationalstiftung, Member of the Senate
 Order of Saint John (Bailiwick of Brandenburg), Member
 , Member
 German Association for People Management (DGFP), Former Member of the Board

Personal life
Weise is married and has two children. He is a member of the Christian Democratic Union of Germany (CDU).

Publications
 Steuerfibel für Soldaten. Anleitung zum Lohnsteuerjahresausgleich 1980. Anleitung zur Einkommensteuererklärung. Pahl & Ardelt, Haibach 1980.
 Dienstzeitende. Was ist zu tun. Pahl & Ardelt, Langen 1982.
 Steuerfibel für Polizeibeamte. Schutzpolizei, Kriminalpolizei, Bundesgrenzschutz. Anleitung zum Lohnsteuerjahresausgleich. Anleitung zur Einkommen-Steuererklärung. Pahl & Ardelt, Haibach 1983.
 Einführen von Logistik. Eine spannende Anleitung zum programmierten Erfolg. Schäffer-Poeschel, Stuttgart 1993, .
 Bericht der Strukturkommission der Bundeswehr Oktober 2010. Vom Einsatz her Denken, Konzentration, Flexibilitär, Effizienz. (=''Report of the Structural Commission of the Bundeswehr October 2010) (PDF)

References

External link

1951 births
Living people
People from Radebeul
Christian Democratic Union of Germany politicians
German Army personnel
Businesspeople from Saxony
Hertie School people
Military personnel from Saxony